Maari is a 2015 Indian Tamil-language action comedy film written and directed by Balaji Mohan, jointly produced by Listin Stephen and Raadhika's Magic Frames and Dhanush's Wunderbar Films. The film stars Dhanush, singer Vijay Yesudas, and Kajal Aggarwal, while  Robo Shankar, Kalloori Vinoth, Kaali Venkat, and Mime Gopi play supporting roles. Dhanush plays Maari, a local gangster. This film also marks Vijay Yesudas's Tamil debut.

Anirudh Ravichander composed the film's soundtrack and score while Om Prakash and Prasanna G. K. undertook the film's cinematography and editing respectively. After being in pre-production phase since March 2014, principal photography began on 5 November 2014 and lasted till 15 March 2015. The film was shot in and around Chennai and Tuticorin. Maari was released on 17 July 2015. The film received poor reviews upon its release, but had a decent collection at the box office. It was remade in Bengali as Bossgiri (2016). A sequel titled Maari 2 was released on 21 December 2018.

Plot 
Police Constable Arumugam talks to the new Sub-Inspector, Arjun, about Maari, a local rowdy who rose to fame after killing a rival rowdy. Maari is an irritating guy, who, along with his henchmen Sanikilamai and Adithangi, constantly pesters the people in the area and extorts money from them. His main line of work is in training racing pigeons. His boss is Velu, a bigger don who is also involved in the pigeon races, as well as the smuggling of sandalwood.

Maari constantly has fights with "Bird" Ravi, another local rowdy who is also working under Velu. One day, a lady named Sridevi enters the business, trying to open a boutique in Maari's area. Maari forcefully becomes her partner in the business, which angers her after she loses some customers. She decides to help Arjun catch Maari by getting close to him, pretending to fall in love with him, and incriminating him with evidence of his confession: he had tried to kill the rival rowdy, but failed. She shoots the talk with Maari in the drunken state, who describes about the murder, saying that somebody else had killed him, and he took the credit. Maari is soon arrested by Arjun. Seven months later, when he is released, he finds out that Velu also has been arrested, Arjun is actually a corrupt cop, and he and Ravi are working together and have arrested some people in the area under the pretext of smuggling, to extort money. Maari decides to take revenge on the duo. He first frees the local people from the extortion by Ravi's gang, while Sridevi also falls in love with him for real.

Later, Maari captures one of Arjun's smuggling vehicles and the driver, by which he forces Arjun to release Velu. When Arjun takes revenge by burning Maari's pigeon coop, which kills 10 of his pigeons, he gets angry and beats up Arjun, Ravi and their henchmen, where Ravi agrees to confess to everything. Angered, Arjun stabs Ravi but eventually gets arrested by the Revenue Department after Aarumugam reveals all of his secrets. Finally, Sridevi approaches Maari to confess her love to him, which he rejects, returning to pester the local people and extort them for cash.

Cast 

 Dhanush as Maariyappan "Maari", a local gangster who pesters the citizens in the Chennai vicinity and extorts money from them
 Kajal Aggarwal as Sridevi, an entrepreneur who starts a business in Maari's land
 Vijay Yesudas as Inspector Arjun Kumar, a police officer who wants to get rid of Maari to take charge of his land
 Robo Shankar as Sanikilamai, Maari's henchman
 Kalloori Vinoth as Robert (Adithangi), Maari's henchman
 Kaali Venkat as Aarumugam, a constable who works for Arjun but supports Maari in the end
 Shanmugarajan as Velu Anna, a local underworld don and Maari's boss
 Mime Gopi as "Bird" Ravi, a local gangster who wants to get rid of Maari with Arjun
 Supergood Subramani as TV Shop Owner
 Sriranjini as Sridevi's mother
 Sampath Ram as Pandi
 Chelladurai as Maari's supporter
 Azhagu as Anbu
 Prem as Prem
 Raja Rani Pandian
 George Vijay Nelson
 Kamalesh Kumar
 Sharmila
 Sharath
Anirudh Ravichander as himself (Guest appearance)
 Baba Bhaskar (special appearance in the song "Maari Thara Local")
Balaji Mohan in a cameo appearance

Production

Pre-production 
The collaboration between Listin Stephen and Raadhika's production house and director Balaji Mohan was first revealed in early January 2014, with Dhanush and Kajal Aggarwal being signed on to be a part of the "romantic entertainer". The first look poster released later indicated that Dhanush was a co-producer of the film. Mohan wanted the film not to be a bilingual like his previous ventures as he found the process difficult to shoot the same shot twice and to retain the same energy in both of them. He said in an interview in March 2014 that he narrated a one-liner to Dhanush, on whose consent, he would develop the complete script after releasing Vaayai Moodi Pesavum (2014), adding that this film would "definitely not be a love story". Dhanush had said in early August 2014 that the project was in its pre-production stages. Anirudh Ravichander, who was supposed to work with Mohan for Vaayai Moodi Pesavum, was selected as the film's music director, marking his fifth collaboration with Wunderbar Films. Prasanna, an assistant of A. Sreekar Prasad, was signed in on as the film's editor while Om Prakash undertook the cinematography. Vijai Murugan was signed in on as the film's art director. On 7 November 2014, Mohan announced that the film was titled Maari.

Dhanush was initially rumoured to be seen as a tailor living in north-Madras in the film. Sources close to the film's unit later said that he would be seen as a local slum chieftain for which he had to speak in a Madras accent. His character was later revealed to be a person who is into pigeon racing, similar to the one he played in Aadukalam (2011), where he was seen as a person dealing with rooster fights. Kajal Aggarwal, who was supposed to work with Dhanush in Polladhavan (2007), was cast on Dhanush's insistence, who wanted to gain a foothold in Telugu cinema by cashing in on Aggarwal's stardom there. She said in an interview that she overcame her fear of birds due to her experiences with pigeons during the film's shoot. Although Kajal Aggarwal was signed during the film's initial stages of production, she joined the sets in November 2014. Robo Shankar, one of the cast of Vaayai Moodi Pesavum, was signed in on for an important role. Playback singer Vijay Yesudas joined the team in December 2014, making his debut as an actor in Tamil cinema. He stated in late February 2015 that he would play the role of a police officer. Anirudh made a cameo appearance in the film and joined its sets in mid March 2015.

Filming 
Principal photography began on 4 November 2014 at T. Nagar in Chennai.  The film's second schedule began on 25 November 2014. By 11 December 20 days of the film's shoot was done including a montage song. A special set was erected at Valasaravakkam, Chennai where portions of the film including a song and a fight sequence were shot for 20 days continuously from 23 December 2014.

By 8 January 2015, half of the film shoot was completed, which included two songs. The team planned two short schedules, one before Pongal and one around 20 January 2015 for 5 days. Filming continued at a market area in Triplicane during early February 2015 and a similar set was erected in Chennai to shoot major portions of the film. The film's shoot was wrapped up by 21 February 2015 in four months. It was later known that 20% of the filming is remaining for which the film's team left for Tuticorin port to shoot the film's last schedule. The song "Thara Local Boys" featuring Dhanush and Anirudh was shot in mid March 2015. Dhanush confirmed the completion of principal photography on 15 March 2015 through his Twitter page.

Soundtrack 

The soundtrack album was composed by Anirudh Ravichander, with lyrics written by Dhanush, Vignesh Shivan and G. Rokesh. The film marks the third collaboration between Dhanush and Anirudh Ravichander. The album was released on 7 June 2015 through the Sony Music record label.

Release 
The film was scheduled to release on 17 July 2015, coinciding with the Eid al-Fitr. Despite the release of Baahubali: The Beginning, and had a biggest opening of 294 screens in Chennai city, and 600 screens in Tamil Nadu, on the first day of its release, after Velaiilla Pattadhari, the second Dhanush-starrer film to have a huge opening at the box office.

Distribution 
In addition the film was dubbed and released in Hindi as Rowdy Hero and in Telugu as Mass  in 2016. The rights for the Telugu dubbed version were acquired by Vasireddi Padmakara Rao.

Promotion 
The first look poster of the film was released on 7 November 2014, revealed by Dhanush on Twitter. The new poster is loud and colorful and features Dhanush of course in rounded sunglasses, with a colourful scarf and a gold chain. The second look poster was released on 1 January 2015, coinciding the New Year's Day, featuring Dhanush tweaking his moustache. The teaser of the film was released on 20 May 2015, which happens to be the introduction scene of Dhanush from a fight sequence, who walks in from behind a car with a cigarette in his hand. The stylish entry of Dhanush and with the background score composed by Anirudh adds the mass effect of the teaser. The cinematography is handled by Om Prakash and the teaser has raised the expectations of the film. The theatrical trailer of Maari was released on 25 June 2015.

Home Media 
Star Vijay acquired the satellite rights of the film, initially reporting that the satellite rights were secured by Sun TV. The film's television premiere took place on 10 November 2015, at 10:00 a.m. IST during Diwali.

Reception

Critical reception 
Maari received polarized reviews from critics, who praised the music, production values, humour, and performances of Dhanush and Robo Shankar, while criticizing the director for making a routine masala fare and deviating from the offbeat comical tone of his previous two directorial ventures.

Baradwaj Rangan wrote, "Save for the bits with Robo Shankar, the writing is shockingly ordinary — lots of tells, very little show...Does making a mass movie mean that you forget to make an interesting one?" The Times of India gave 2 out of 5 and wrote, "If you, like many others, had been excited about Maari after watching its trailer, be prepared for disappointment. Almost all the worst bits from the film are already in the trailer and the film clearly lacks the crackling energy that we see in the trailer. Maari largely feels like one huge build-up without any proper pay-off". NDTV wrote, "A couple of mass moments and some quirky humor apart, there's nothing in Maari to justify the much-anticipated Balaji Mohan- Dhanush collaboration". Indo-Asian News Service wrote, "the director isn't capable of delivering a wholesome commercial entertainer with some story, some heroism and some cliches a la Dhanush's recent blockbuster Vella Illa Pattathari. Except for the story, we get everything else from Maari, and that's the smallest concern of the movie", with the critic adding that "Dhanush saves a very ordinary film". Rediff gave 0.5 out of 5 and wrote, "Uninspiring and predictable, director Balaji Mohan's Maari is just another mass masala movie created to idolise its hero". The New Indian Express wrote, "The director's attempt to go ‘commercial’ this time, concentrating more on his hero than the script, backfires. The film gives a sense of Deja vu throughout, the real interesting moments very few and far between", calling the film "a painless tedious experience, meant for hardcore Dhanush fans".

Behindwoods gave 1.5 out of 5 and stated "Maari is a very dummy masala flick made to satisfy the mass audience". Sify gave 1 out of 5 by saying Director Balaji Mohan has made the film with childish punch dialogues, slow-motion shots and an adrenaline flawless background score by Anirudh.  It is a film that makes no bones, no pretenses about the fact that it is packaged for E audiences.

Box office
Maari collected 9 - 10.3 crore on its opening weekend (domestic) which was the highest for Dhanush. The film was released in 294 screens in Chennai, where it collected 1.61 crore, The film managed to cross 23 crore in three weeks of its release.

Controversies 
Former health minister and politician Anbumani Ramadoss, criticised Dhanush for portraying on-screen smoking in this film. Replying to this Dhanush, in an interview, stated "It is a call taken by the director of the film. The script and my character of a local thug demanded such a sequence in the film. But in real life, I don’t smoke. And I request my fans to take that as inspiration and not to smoke, and give up smoking if they are smokers."

Sequel 

A sequel, titled Maari 2, was in the making till April 2018, and announced on 28 October 2018. Actress Sai Pallavi portrayed the leading lady role, replacing Kajal Aggarwal, who played in the first part. Tovino Thomas, Krishna, and Varalakshmi Sarathkumar were joined in the film's cast, with the former playing the antagonist. Yuvan Shankar Raja was signed as the music director, replacing Anirudh Ravichander, who composed music for the previous film. Maari 2 was released on 21 December 2018.

Legacy 
The glasses used by Dhanush in Maari, is a single original piece. There is only one piece of the exact specification of roundness and measurement, and no duplicate and spare version of the glass exists. The crew carefully saved the glasses from Maari and used in its sequel. The outfits worn by Dhanush in this film became popular after its release.

Robo Shankar parodied Dhanush's character in the film Mannar Vagaiyara (2018). Malayalam film actor Dharmajan Bolgatty parodied Dhanush's look in the Malayalam movie Kuttanadan Marpappa directed by Sreejith Vijayan.

References

External links 

2010s Tamil-language films
2015 films
2015 action comedy films
Indian action comedy films
Indian crime action films
2015 masala films
Films scored by Anirudh Ravichander
Films set in Chennai
Films shot in Chennai
Indian crime comedy films
Indian gangster films
2015 crime action films
2010s crime comedy films
2015 comedy films
Films directed by Balaji Mohan
Works about pigeon racing